The 2006 Chrono des Nations was the 25th edition of the Chrono des Nations cycle race and was held on 15 October 2006. The race started and finished in Les Herbiers. The race was won by Raivis Belohvoščiks.

General classification

References

2006
2006 in road cycling
2006 in French sport
October 2006 sports events in France